Mohan Lal Badoli is an Indian politician. He was elected to the Haryana Legislative Assembly from Rai in the 2019 Haryana Legislative Assembly election as a member of the Bharatiya Janata Party. He handled the position of Mandal Adkhyaksh (Murthal) in 1995. He was elected as Zila Parishad during Honourable PM Atal Bihari Vajpayee's government. In 2019, he contested  Legislative Assembly and won with a margin of 2,663 votes. He is the first BJP candidate ever to win from this seat i.e. Rai Vidhansabha. Mohan Lal Badoli is closely related to Rashtriya Swayamsevak Sangh from 1989.

Personal life
Mohan Lal Badoli was born in 1963 in Badoli village of Rai tehsil in Sonipat district Haryana. His father, Kali Ram Kaushik, was a respected poet in his village and fond of Poet Pandit Lakhmi Chand of Janti, Sonipat. He is a farmer and businessman.

Badoli completed his matriculation (final year of high school) from GSSS, Khevra, Sonipat. He then ran a shop in cloth market near Bahalgarh Chowk, Sonipat.

Political career
Badoli joined Rashtriya Swayamsevak Sangh (RSS) in 1989, and later joined BJP. He was among the very few BJP party workers of Sonipat area. During the INLD rule he was the first BJP candidate to win Zila Parishad election from Murthal.

In 2019, Badoli was nominated as BJP's candidate from Rai Constituency of Sonipat for the Haryana Legislative Assembly election, 2019. He was able to secure win on this seat, which was considered to be a fixed seat for INC.

In 2020, Badoli was appointed Zila Adhyaksh of BJP Sonipat. Further, in 2021, he was inducted in the core BJP Haryana team with the position of Pradesh Mahamantri.

References 

1962 births
Living people
Bharatiya Janata Party politicians from Haryana
People from Sonipat district
Haryana MLAs 2019–2024